Brachmia circumfusa is a moth in the family Gelechiidae. It was described by Edward Meyrick in 1922. It is found in Guinea.

The wingspan is 12–13 mm. The forewings are pale violet fuscous, the costal and terminal edge are ochreous yellow and the discal stigmata small and blackish, the second somewhat larger. There is a pre-marginal series of small blackish dots around the posterior part of the costa and termen. The hindwings are grey.

References

Moths described in 1922
Brachmia
Taxa named by Edward Meyrick
Moths of Africa